Kathrin Lüthi (born 7 October 1969) is a Swiss sprinter. She competed in the women's 4 × 400 metres relay at the 1992 Summer Olympics.

References

External links
 

1969 births
Living people
Athletes (track and field) at the 1992 Summer Olympics
Swiss female sprinters
Olympic athletes of Switzerland
Place of birth missing (living people)
Olympic female sprinters